Stan Fougeroud (born 19 November 1991 in France) is a French former footballer who is last known to have been under contract with Etoile FC of the Singaporean S.League in 2011.

Career

Réunion

Parted ways with AS Excelsior of the Réunion Premier League by January 2011 along with five others.

Singapore

Roped in by Etoile FC of the Singaporean S.League for 2011, the French midfielder claimed that the standard of football there was higher, recommending it to Reunion-based footballers if the prospect of going abroad titillates them. By June that year, he parted ways with the club.

Romania

Had a failed trial with Arieșul Turda in July 2011, a month succeeding his release from Etoile.

References

External links 
 at Soccerway

French expatriate sportspeople in Singapore
1991 births
Living people
Expatriate footballers in Singapore
Toulouse Fontaines Club players
French footballers
Association football midfielders
Expatriate footballers in Réunion
Singapore Premier League players
Toulouse FC players
French expatriate footballers
Étoile FC players